"Rock the Casbah" is a song by The Clash

Rock the Casbah can also refer to:

 Rock the Casbah (2012 film), a 2012 Israeli film
 Rock the Casbah (2013 film), a 2013 French-Moroccan film
 Rock the Kasbah, an annual gala fundraiser benefiting Virgin Unite and The Eve Branson Foundation
 Rock the Kasbah (film), a 2015 U.S. film starring Bill Murray
 Batallion 50 Rock the Hebron Casbah, a viral video